There is significant awareness of Japanese popular culture in the United States. The flow of Japanese animation, fashion, films, manga comics, martial arts, television shows and video games to the United States has increased American awareness of Japanese pop culture, which has had a significant influence on American pop culture, including sequential media and entertainment into the 21st century.

Overview
The reception of Japanese pop culture has typically been a mainly positively accepted one by the United States. While cultural influences are mainly Japanese as due to nation of origin, Japanese pop culture has gained its popularity by high quality and standard of artistic content for sequential media, from not just artistic style and composition, but to writing content, lack of expressive restriction by censorship and moral regulation of works allowed for syndication, diverse portrayals of genres and imaginative ideas explored throughout its library of works, and appealing to generally shared human ideals and the human condition regardless of boundary of nationality and ethnicity.

While anime, manga, and video games respectively have focus of themes and literary approaches unique from each other that define them independently, shared core elements between them allow familiarity for fans to interchange from medium to medium, and provides a sense of unity, consistency, and respected tradition as sequential art. For fans, this artistic consistency establishes common ground for a community as well as a kind of artistic movement and statement. This artistic consistency has been termed "anime style" or "anime" overall by global and American fans by need of identification, ease of recognition, and sense of historic and cultural origins, with manga and anime founded by Osamu Tezuka, and goes further than just tangible art style, writing, or general themes, instead being more like the soul of Japanese popular culture in itself.

History 
Japanese popular culture gradually spread to the United States in several waves during the mid-to-late 20th century:

1940s  Arrival of Japanese martial arts, particularly karate in the United States.
1950s  Arrival of Japanese cinema, including jidaigeki (e.g. Kurosawa's samurai films) and Japanese science fiction (e.g. kaiju such as Godzilla), and judo in the US.
1960s  Arrival of anime on TV (e.g. Astro Boy, Speed Racer, Kimba the White Lion) and Japanese electro-mechanical games in arcades (e.g. Sega's Periscope).
1970s  Japanese "chopsocky" karate martial arts films (e.g. Sonny Chiba) and Japanese arcade video games (e.g. Wheels, Gun Fight, Space Invaders).
1980s:
Golden age of arcade video games (e.g. Pac-Man, Frogger, Galaga, Pole Position) and arrival of Nintendo (e.g. Mario, Game & Watch, NES, Game Boy).
Ninjamania, including ninja films (e.g. Sho Kosugi films), cartoons (e.g. Teenage Mutant Ninja Turtles) and ninja video games (e.g. Shinobi and Ninja Gaiden).
Mecha robot fiction and toys, popularized by Americanized franchises based on Japanese mecha anime and toys (such as Transformers and Robotech).
Growth of karate, popularized by martial arts films (notably The Karate Kid series) and fighting games (notably Karate Champ).
Early-to-mid-1990s:
Growth of fighting games (such as Street Fighter II and Fatal Fury) and Sega Genesis video game console (including games such as Sonic and Streets of Rage).
Mature anime on home video, including Japanese cyberpunk (e.g. Akira, Ghost in the Shell) and martial arts anime (e.g. Fist of the North Star, Street Fighter II).
Japanese superhero TV shows, including Americanized live-action tokusatsu (e.g. Power Rangers  and VR Troopers) and magical girl anime (e.g. Sailor Moon).

In the mid-to-late 1990s, this culminated in Japanese pop culture having a significant impact in the United States, with anime, manga and Japanese video games becoming integrated into American pop culture. It made grassroots due to the cultural, social, moral, and altogether tied political landscape of the United States at the time:

The Dark Age of Comic Books: With the increase of American comic books made solely for the comic book collector's merchandise speculator bubble upon The Death of Superman and poorly written examples of nuanced ambivalent morality by the character archetype known as the "90's comic book antihero", and the bankruptcy of DC Comics and Marvel Comics in 1996, these events would soon entrench comic books as disposable and forgettable male adolescent reading material. While long standing figures of comic books like traditional superheroes and Archie Comics would largely go unharmed in the cultural consensus, the failures and shortcomings of the American comic book industry had snowballed to the point where comic books struggled to uphold its artistic integrity and appeal to new readers into the mid to late 1990s. Anime and manga provided the alternative in the face of this, being able to provide content that was able to reach to both male and female demographics, provide dilemmas and stories that were well written, and showcased topics and subjects not restricted by the Comics Code.  
The revival and revitalizing of the video game market by Nintendo in 1988: Nintendo had helped to re-establish a market for video games in the United States after the video game crash of 1983, due in part that the crash had cemented video games as a dead end of unprofitable business in the electronics industry, and in turn, an untrustworthy investment. With Nintendo reviving the market and paving the way for other competitors and developers by its examples of video games that were of quality and were able to sell by their reputable reputation, this would become some of the first pivotal cultural entries and layouts Japanese popular culture would have to properly settle into American awareness. 
The rise of alternative media in the 1990s: American popular culture soon began to turn to more subversive forms of entertainment upon the end of the 1980s as response to the excesses and indulgences of the prior decade. Many examples include the rise of animated series aimed for older audiences like The Simpsons, Duckman, and Beavis and Butthead, the popularity of the social commentary laden dystopian sci-fi action movie Robocop, and backlash against the practices of the mainstream music industry upon the lip syncing debacle of pop duo Milli Vanilli. In regards to the context of Japanese popular culture within this subject, anime, manga, and video games provided both something "different" while at the same time presented relatable entertainment that resisted the far reaching influence of American politics and morality regarding the regulation of what can be presented and shown as entertainment.

Anime in the United States
Anime differs from American animation in the range of its audiences and themes. Although there are anime for all different age groups, it is made for young teenagers and adults more often than are American cartoons, and often deals with more serious themes. Anime and manga incorporate a multitude of genres such as romance, action, horror, comedy, drama and cover a wide variety of topics like teen suicides, high school rivalries, and social commentary, and more subjects. Described as a gateway for many fans that takes them to a whole new culture; it is sometimes used as a way to learn about Japan. People who are avid devotees to anime in the United States affectionately refer to themselves as otaku, although in Japan the term is similar to geek, and is commonly frowned upon by society. Much like punk and goth, anime has become a subculture.

History
Anime culture in the United States began as a niche community that had a grassroots foundation built by groups of fans on the local level. Some of the earliest televised anime to air in the United States were Astro Boy, Speed Racer, and Gigantor, which gained popularity with many American audiences during the late 1960s. Speed Racer was watched by a total estimated audience of  American viewers during the 1960s1970s. Anime shows that aired in the United States up until the 1980s were usually heavily altered and localized, such as Science Ninja Team Gatchaman becoming Battle of the Planets in the 1970s, and the mecha show Macross becoming Robotech in the 1980s. Takara's Diaclone and Microman mecha toylines also became the basis for the Transformers franchise in the 1980s.

Small patches of isolated communities started to form around collective interest towards this new medium, which seemed reminiscent of familiar Disney visuals and Warner-Brothers narratives. One of these communities was the first anime fan club called the Cartoon/Fantasy Organization (C/FO), formed in Los Angeles, California during 1977; club actives involved monthly meets in order to watch newly aired anime. The early popularity was driven by fan-subtitled content and remained that way until much later, when inter-connected entrepreneurs from Japan and the United States saw an opportunity for business through this new medium. These business opportunities eventually led to the founding of Streamline Pictures, the United States' first anime import company in 1989, thus starting anime's widespread commercialization. Over the next dozen years, anime fans became more connected through fan-held conventions and the internet. These groups began to develop new social identities, centered around what they saw as an overall interconnected community.

A subculture began to grow around the United States revolving around people who identified with the social identity “Anime fan.” The strong imagined community built by the fandom since the earliest days was both the backbone and reason for the subculture's growth. Today, early 2000s anime shows like Pokémon have become almost universally recognized media in the United States.

This love for anime in the United States has even brought out well known movie stars to produce and star (their voice) in these series.  Michael B. Jordan, from Black Panther & Creed fame, is starring in his own series and producing the series gen:LOCK. This has helped the genre to grow more and this has helped sales and influence many creators. Anime which is a type of Japanese art is used by some American teachers to teach Japanese culture in classrooms. It draws student interest and increases their contribution to the course as it is an entertaining form of learning. Many already have great interest in the popular culture of anime mainly due to the popularity of some such as Pokémon, making its use as a teaching tool very effective. Students new to it are equally intrigued by this style of learning and generally adapt with minimum difficulty. They get to learn not just the culture of Japan to satisfy the course syllabus through anime short videos but also get to know how anime is created.

Anime fan-culture 
Although anime can be considered by some as distinctly Japanese animation, some scholars and fans relate to them by their animated nature similar to the works of Walt Disney. Researchers found that this created a subset of people that distinguish themselves from the similar subculture of Japanophiles. The fandom originally proliferated using participatory media via the nature of fan-subbing anime, or the English subtitling of the original Japanese shows. The fans of anime usually referred to as Otaku have been credited as the ones who ushered anime into America. Anime serves as a channel where many are initially introduced to Japanese culture and for others the only connection with Japan they can ever have. Some avid fans however choose to go the extra mile of visiting Japan in person to experience the culture they have viewed through the world of anime in real life. This voluntary labor connects people on a global scale as fans from all over the world participate in and benefit from the collective community's work. During the 1990s, industry officials viewed fan-subtitlers as useful to the budding Anime industry, as they used fan production to see where potentially profitable markets might lie. Interviews from some of the earliest fansubbers reveal that most of them subscribed to an unspoken code that they should not make a profit from their illegal activities. However, most distributors did ask to be reimbursed for the cost of the tape and for shipping. Whether through fansubbing or professional industry-translated anime and manga, the North American distribution of anime and manga has been primarily an import business for the Japanese-produced content. However, due to the nature of its roots, the fandom is better thought of as a hybrid of American and Japanese cultural notes. It is also viewed that the current generation are using their intense love for anime, which is a cultural object to distinguish themselves from prior generations.

Interview with modern-day anime fans reveal that some have no interest in its Japanese roots, merely that they enjoy the fashion or particular facets of the fandom. Scholars highlight the reason for this phenomenon as being the increasing hybrid factor of anime caused by integrating North America's popular culture characteristics. Because of the nature of imports, scholars found that the natural selectivity of anime importing by American companies cause the perception of anime to grow increasingly Western, as anime itself as a medium covers a broad range of genres.

Anime would later go on to infiltrate one of the biggest cartoon networks in the United States— the fittingly named Cartoon Network.  This has had a huge impact on a new generation of viewers by introducing them to anime and it's a distinctive style. If one were to watch some of the original Cartoon Network series, such as The Amazing World of Gumball and Teen Titans, one could see how they utilized the anime style with their animation (such as face expressions that are commonly seen in Japanese media) and even their theme song. The Amazing World of Gumball in particular has a lot of references to various anime, which while being a nice treat for those already invested in the media, will let newer views become familiarized with anime media should they ever come by it. It has become so popular; they have even created a special time slot for new series and re-occurring popular series on their Saturday night Toonami segment.  There is a rich culture that is brought out in the anime; you can watch about Japan's early history about the samurai and the bloody wars that are associated with them.  Having these types of “historical” anime gives people an insight on how Japan became how it is today, granted it does have some creator interpretation on the story which might not be historically accurate.  But these anime like Rurouni Kenshin gives the viewer a glimpse in the Meiji era and has plenty of action and romance as well.  This has influence other American shows like Samurai Jack and Afro Samurai: Resurrection that had the voice of Samuel L. Jackson.

Anime conventions

Primarily the function of anime conventions in the United States is to give a place to fans of anime, manga and Japanese culture. There are a range of informational panels offered at these conventions from the basics of Japanese language and culture to cutting edge news about anime releases in Japan and the US. Anime conventions also provide performances and vendors of Japanese goods, manga, anime, figurines and Anime related merchandise.  Most American anime conventions are fan operated, the increase in popularity starting in the '90s, sprung forth a long-standing list of annual conventions, such as Anime Expo, AnimeFest, Otakon, and Anime Boston, which continue to today with numbers of attendance reaching over 100,000.

Anime influence and sales

Through the last two decades the introduction of anime into American mainstream culture has furthered its popularity. Such famous titles as Sailor Moon, Dragon Ball Z, and most importantly Pokémon have influenced anime's appeal to young Americans. "Anime already makes up an estimated 60% of all broadcast animation across the world." "ICv2 estimates the size of the North American anime market at $275-300 million" (in retail dollars)." In the search for a global market for local Japanese artwork such as anime other related products, companies like Sony and Sumitomo brought their products to America. In the United States, the period referred to as "the golden age" of Japanese anime started from the middle of the 1990s. Anime sales to the United States were 3.2 times higher than revenue made from the exportation of steel from Japan to the States in 2003. Many people tapped into the booming anime market and developed consumer products that centered on the current lifestyle .  It served as a bridge that connected Japan and America through artwork. To compete with its Japanese competitors, many production companies in the US have adjusted their style to one inspired by anime to hold onto their viewers. An important example that has sparked much controversy in the animation world would be Avatar: The Last Airbender. A popular show on Nickelodeon, the characters have a distinct anime style, even the expressions and mannerism are drawn evoke that of anime style. Teen Titans on Cartoon Network is yet another example of anime's influence on cartoons, as well as a popular comic strip, turned cartoon called The Boondocks. In recent years there has also been the development of anime developed in the United States in collaboration with Japan, examples would be the Netflix original series Neo Yokio and Castlevania (TV series) based on the video game series. The globalization of Asian cultures such as anime is mainly fueled by economic gains.

Unlike American cartoons where they have a lot of standalone episodes with each having their own stories where you can jump into the series and enjoy it, Japanese anime has more of a complex storyline that builds upon previous episodes. This is why it is so popular in the United States since people can get to know the characters better and become invested in the series and at times dress up like them for conventions or just cosplay. The show incorporates real life in the series where the viewer can see the person attend High School, which is similar to the ones in real life. They can learn a lot about the Japanese culture which enticed people to want to learn more about the culture and even possibly visit Japan. With the Anime boom and how much revenue is created from this, the United States has jumped on board to create their own shows with anime-style animation and story arcs. You can see this in the Avatar: The Last Airbender, as well as its sequel, The Legend of Korra.

Fashion
Japanese street fashion trends have influenced Western fashion trends in the early 21st century. In the 2000s, American popstars such as Avril Lavigne had an affinity for Japanese kawaii culture. The origins of 2010s e-girl fashion has been traced to 2000s Japanese fashion trends including anime, cosplay, kawaii and lolita fashion styles.

Cosplay

The term "cosplay" corresponds to an abbreviation of the English words costume play, though the term was coined in Japan the practice is not solely Japanese. The use of the term cosplay applies to any costumed role play outside of theaters. Characters are often taken from popular Japanese fiction. Popular sources that fans draw from include anime, manga, video games, comic books, and graphic novels. American cosplayers practice this form of fandom at anime conventions. However, there are a growing number of web pages and photo sites dedicated to the art of cosplaying, such as DeviantArt and Cosplay.com.

Live-action film and television
The following Japanese live-action film and television genres have also had a significant influence on American popular culture:

Jidaigeki (Japanese historical fiction)
Samurai cinema (chanbara)  examples include Akira Kurosawa films such as Seven Samurai, The Hidden Fortress and Yojimbo
Ninja fiction  see ninjas in popular culture and ninja films
Tokusatsu (Japanese science fiction)
Kaiju (monster films)  examples include Godzilla, Gamera and Ultraman
Sentai (superhero shows)  examples include the Ultraman, Super Sentai (Power Rangers) and Metal Hero (VR Troopers) franchises
Japanese television drama  examples include manga adaptations such as Great Teacher Onizuka, Hana Yori Dango and Nodame Cantabile
Japanese horror  examples include the Ring and Grudge franchises

Manga in the United States 

Along with the translating and purchasing of Japanese manga in the United States, this led to the development of artists and writers in the country to develop their own manga. These were called Original English Language manga (OEL manga for short). These comics were mostly a retelling of a piece of American entertainment, such as Disney films, or perhaps a sequel to a movie, TV series, or adaptation of a video game.

Manga influence and sales
Calvin Reid of Publishers Weekly estimated that the "Total U.S. manga sales in 2007 rose about 10%, to more than $220 million, and about 1,468 titles are estimated to have been released last year."  With the popularity of manga on the rise graphic novel artists are beginning to adapt their style to that of manga. Manga provides diversity in the graphic novel department not seen in the American comic book industry. In a different trend celebrities are getting their hands into the manga market, rock star Courtney Love has published her own manga called Princess Ai. The production of original English language manga has started. CBR columnists Joe Casey and Matt Fraction describe the increase of manga sales in the United States, "Manga is the 900-pound bear in the comics shop. Inescapable, unavoidable, and impossible to ignore, the manga explosion is either going to go away—which is bad, as so many mass-market bookstores seem to be bulking up their comics supply based on manga's lead—or manga will continue to grow—also bad, as the direct market scrambles to keep up. The entire industry is being forced, month by month, little by little, into a paradigm shift not seen since the advent of the direct market in the early '80s, all thanks to these strange little books from far away."

Martial arts

Popular Japanese martial arts include judo, ju-jitsu, aikido, and Okinawan martial arts such as karate.

Music

Japanese pop and rock music acts are also increasing in popularity amongst US listeners. Such artists include L'Arc-en-Ciel, Miyavi, T.M.Revolution, Hikaru Utada, Asian Kung-Fu Generation, Dir En Grey, Yellow Magic Orchestra, and Susumu Hirasawa. Growing in popularity by the year these performers have toured the United States at least twice playing at small venues in Boston, New York City and Los Angeles each time increasing their fan base. Japanese American artist Hikaru Utada released an English debut album in 2004, her single "Devil Inside" topped the Billboard Hot Dance/Club Airplay charts. Dir En Grey, in early 2006 started touring the US. Japanese idols, like Morning Musume, AKB48 and S/mileage are now becoming known in the US thanks to the internet. In 2009, Morning Musume performed at Anime Expo and in 2010 AKB48 played there. Also in 2010, influential metal band X Japan performed their first US tour, selling out most shows. In April 2011, Berryz Kobo played at an anime convention in Washington. Japanese manga art has also influenced American music artists and singers, such as Pharrell Williams whose music video It Girl (Pharrell Williams song) contains a wide array of anime style artwork. Even the electronic musicians Daft Punk have collaborated with Japanese studio Toei Animation to produce Interstella 5555, a film based on their album Discovery.

Video games 

Since the early 1970s, Japan has been home to some of the most famous and influential video game companies in the world; some of the most well-known include Nintendo, Sega, Sony, Namco, Capcom, Konami and Square Enix. The games produced by the companies are extremely well known across the world, including famous arcade games such as Space Invaders and Pac-Man, and incredibly popular franchises such as Mario, The Legend of Zelda, Final Fantasy, Metal Gear, Street Fighter, Sonic the Hedgehog, Pokémon and Resident Evil. Numerous Japanese games have been ranked among the best games of all time, and have spawned sequels, remakes and adaptations.

See also
Japanese popular culture
List of J-pop concerts held outside Asia
Anime
Manga

Notes

References 
 
 
 
 
 
 Johnson-Woods, Toni (2010). Manga: An Anthology of Global and Cultural Perspectives. New York: The Continuum International Publishing Group Inc
 Kohler, Chris (2016). Power-Up: How Japanese Video Games Gave the World an Extra Life. New York: Dover Publications

Japanese popular culture